For Spanish music, see Music of Spain.

"Music from Spain" is a short story by Eudora Welty, published in 1948 as a limited edition monograph by the Levee Press in Greenville, Mississippi, and as a part of the short story collection The Golden Apples in 1949.

References

1946 short stories
Short stories by Eudora Welty